Papanggo is one of seven administrative villages (kelurahan in Indonesian) in  Tanjung Priok subdistrict, North Jakarta. The borders of Papanggo are: 
 Warakas administrative village in the north
 Sungai Bambu administrative village in the west
 Sunter Agung administrative village in the east and in the south

The zip code of this administrative village is 14340.

Toponymy
The name Papanggo comes from the Dutch language term De Papangers, meaning "the people of Pampanga," which originally referred to Mardijker soldiers, who served with the Dutch, or their descendants. They originated from Catholic freed slaves originally captured from Pampanga in the Spanish Philippines by Moro raiders and sold in slave markets in Batavia. The name was also applied to similar freed Catholic slaves originating from Goa and the islands of Ambon, Ternate, and Tidore in the Maluku Islands.

References

Administrative villages in Jakarta